Sir Alan Arthur Walters (17 June 1926 – 3 January 2009) was a British economist who was best known as the Chief Economic Adviser to Prime Minister Margaret Thatcher from 1981 to 1983 and (after his return from the United States) again for five months in 1989.

Early life 
Walters was born in Leicester. His father was a Communist and a grocer who sold goods from a van. He failed his 11-Plus and attended Alderman Newton's School in Leicester, leaving at fifteen to work as a machine operator in a shoe factory. During World War II, he was called up and joined the British Army as a private.

Academic career 
Walters studied statistics at University College Leicester and then went to Nuffield College, Oxford, where he took an MA in economics. On leaving Nuffield in 1951, he took up a post to teach statistics at Birmingham University, later becoming professor of econometrics and statistics there in the early 1960s. He was one of the first British economists to argue that money was "of considerable importance" to economic activity, a view that became more widespread during "the Great Inflation" of the 1970s. He argued forcefully that Britain should maintain strict monetary targets, and that the money supply should not be manipulated for political reasons.

In 1968–70 he was a member of the Commission on the Third London Airport (the "Roskill Commission").

After serving as a professor at the London School of Economics from 1968 to 1976, where he was Sir Ernest Cassel Professor of Economics, Walters became an economic adviser to the World Bank and a professor in the Economics Department at The Johns Hopkins University.

One of his most important contributions to economic theory was to demonstrate empirically that, for many industries, the costs at the high-scale end of the long-run cost curve is essentially constant or even declining. This was established in his article "Production and Cost Functions: An Econometric Survey", published by the journal Econometrica.

Political career 
In 1981, he was asked to become an economic adviser to Prime Minister Margaret Thatcher (who was elected in the 1979 general election), and advised on that year's budget, in which taxes were increased during a recession. This policy produced much criticism and was associated with rioting and high unemployment, but it has been claimed that it enabled the sustained economic growth of the 1990s. He left this role in 1983 to join the American Enterprise Institute and at least some aspects of monetarist policies were publicly repudiated by Thatcher in 1985. He did, however, return to advise Thatcher in 1989, but his differences with the policies of the Chancellor of the Exchequer, Nigel Lawson, led to the resignation of both men on 26 October 1989.

Walters supported the controversial and ill-fated Community Charge (referred to as the "poll tax").  He opposed the similarly ill-fated policy of entry into the European Monetary System. In 1997, he stood as the Referendum Party candidate for the safe Conservative seat of the Cities of London and Westminster achieving 3% of the vote.

Personal life 

In 1975, Walters married Margaret Patricia Wilson, known as Paddie. He had a daughter by a previous marriage. He was knighted in the Queen's 1983 Birthday Honours List.

He was an accomplished pianist, enjoying playing the works of Chopin and Beethoven. He also collected Thai porcelain and was a keen tennis player.

Walters was vice-chairman and Director of AIG Trading Group, Inc.

Towards the end of his life, he suffered from Parkinson's disease. He died aged 82 at his home on 3 January 2009 after a short illness. Upon hearing of his death, Thatcher described him as "radical, fearless" and the "finest of friends". Coincidentally he died on the same day that the first "Genesis" block of the cryptocurrency and decentralized payment system Bitcoin was established.

References

External links
 
The Papers of Sir Alan Walters held at Churchill Archives Centre

1926 births
2009 deaths
British economists
Monetary economists
Alumni of University of London Worldwide
Alumni of the University of London
Academics of the London School of Economics
Academics of the University of Birmingham
Alumni of Nuffield College, Oxford
Alumni of the University of Leicester
Johns Hopkins University faculty
Knights Bachelor
People educated at Alderman Newton's School, Leicester
Referendum Party politicians
Fellows of the Econometric Society
British Army personnel of World War II
British Army soldiers